Hubrechtella is a genus of nemerteans belonging to the monotypic family Hubrechtellidae.

Species:

Hubrechtella alba 
Hubrechtella atypica 
Hubrechtella combinata 
Hubrechtella dubia 
Hubrechtella ehrenbergi 
Hubrechtella globocystica 
Hubrechtella ijimai 
Hubrechtella indica 
Hubrechtella juliae 
Hubrechtella kimuraorum 
Hubrechtella malabarensis 
Hubrechtella queenslandica 
Hubrechtella sarodravayensis 
Hubrechtella sinimarina

References

Nemertea genera
Anopla